Daireaux Partido is a partido in the central west of Buenos Aires Province in Argentina.

Settlements
Andant 
Arboledas
Daireaux
Enrique Lavalle  
Freyre
La Copeta
La Larga
La Manuela 
Mouras
Salazar

External links
 Daireaux website
 Deropedia, Daireaux free encyclopedia
 Federal website

 
1910 establishments in Argentina
Partidos of Buenos Aires Province
Populated places established in 1910